Aleh Yevenka (Belarusian: Алег Евенка born 21 January 1991), better known as Oleg Yevenko (Russian: Олег Евенко), is a Belarusian ice hockey defenceman who is currently an unrestricted free agent. He most recently played with HC Spartak Moscow of the Kontinental Hockey League (KHL).

Playing career
Oleg played two years with the Fargo Force of the USHL and was a popular player known for his defensive play, hard hits, and fighting skills.
Yevenko played collegiate hockey with the UMass Minutemen. After completing his Senior year at UMass, he signed an Amateur Try Out with the Adirondack Flames of the AHL to finish the 2014–15 season. Yevenko went scoreless in 4 games with the Flames.

On 29 June 2015, Yevenko signed a one-year AHL contract with the Lake Erie Monsters, an affiliate of the Columbus Blue Jackets. After receiving an invitation to the Blue Jackets training camp for 2015, Yevenko impressed the club to earn a one-year, two-way NHL contract on 1 October 2015.

At the conclusion of his entry-level contract with the Blue Jackets, Yevenko was not tendered an offer as an restricted free agent on June 26, 2017.
As a free agent, Yevenko opted to continue in the AHL, returning within the Calgary Flames organization by signing a one-year deal with the Stockton Heat and agreeing to an invite to participate at the Flames training camp. On September 19, 2017, Yevenko was reassigned by the Flames to the Heat. In the 2017–18 season, Yevenko was limited to just 23 games as depth to the Heat's blueline, contributing with 3 assists.

As a free agent Yevenko ended his North American career in signing a one-year deal with hometown club, HC Dinamo Minsk of the KHL on May 2, 2018.

After two seasons in his native Belarus, Yevenko left Dinamo Minsk as a free agent, continuing in the KHL on a one-year contract with Russian club, Traktor Chelyabinsk on 8 May 2020.

Yevenko left Traktor Chelyabinsk at the conclusion of his contract, opting to continue in the KHL with HC Spartak Moscow by signing a one-year deal as a free agent on 18 June 2021.

International play
Yevenko was named to the Belarus men's national ice hockey team for competition at the 2014 IIHF World Championship.

Career statistics

Regular season and playoffs

International

References

External links

1991 births
Living people
Adirondack Flames players
Belarusian ice hockey defencemen
Cleveland Monsters players
HC Dinamo Minsk players
Fargo Force players
Lake Erie Monsters players
UMass Minutemen ice hockey players
HC Spartak Moscow players
Ice hockey people from Minsk
Stockton Heat players
Traktor Chelyabinsk players